Marcel Deléon (1894-1967) was a French businessman and historian. He won the Prix Marcelin Guérin from the Académie française for Le nid de l’aigle. Voyage à l'île d'Elbe in 1935.

References

1894 births
1967 deaths
People from Isère
20th-century French businesspeople
20th-century French historians